John Jackson Adams, 1st Baron Adams, OBE, JP (12 October 1890 – 23 August 1960) was a British politician and public servant. The son of Thomas Adams and Mary Bowness, he was raised to the peerage as Baron Adams on 16 February 1949, the first Cumberland-born man to be so honoured since 1797.

Background
Born in 1890 in Arlecdon, Cumberland, he was educated at Arlecdon Council School, but left at an early age to earn family income; first in farm service, and then in the mines, as his father had been killed in a mining accident when John Adams was only four. In 1910 he emigrated to New Zealand, along with men who later occupied cabinet posts in that country. He returned to West Cumberland in 1914 and plunged into local politics.

Career
In 1919 he led a successful election challenge to the sitting members of Arlecdon and Frizington District Council. This established the first all-Labour council to be elected in England, and he held the office of Chairman of the Arlecdon and Frizington Urban District Council from 1919 to 1923. He also became a County Councillor in 1919 and from 1922 was vice-chairman of the County Health Committee, and later chairman, during which time infant mortality in the area dropped by 60%. In 1921 he became general secretary of the Winding Enginemen's Union, based in Workington, and was a member of Workington Borough Council from 1923 to 1931. Before 1934 he was honoured with the office of County Alderman.

The effect of the depression in West Cumberland was so severe that in the 1930s West Cumberland became a "Special Area". John Adams was invited to become secretary to the new "Cumberland Development Council". He also became general manager of the West Cumberland Industrial Development Co. Ltd, with the intent of building factories to let, of which the first was at Millom, whilst at Whitehaven the West Cumberland Silk Mills was established. Another great success was the re-opening of the Whitehaven coal mines in 1937, with help from the Nuffield Trust. A particular ingredient in his success was his ability to attract cross-party support, and help from those not normally involved in politics; uniting a common realisation of the terrible effects of over 50% unemployment in West Cumberland.

He held the office of Deputy Regional Controller of the Board of Trade for Cumberland and Westmorland Sub-region between 1944 and 1948, and on retiring from that post was appointed an OBE. He had also laid the groundwork of attracting the fledgling Nuclear Industry to West Cumberland, and as a consequence the Royal Ordnance Factory Sellafield became the Windscale, and later the Windscale and Calder Works, of the UKAEA (now known as Sellafield Site). This soaked up the post-war labour released from the Sellafield and Drigg ROFs and from the declining mining and heavy industries of West Cumberland. This is perhaps his most enduring legacy. In 1949 Adams was elevated to the peerage as Baron Adams, of Ennerdale in the County of Cumberland.

He retired in 1959, and died in 1960. He is buried in Arlecdon churchyard.  The Adams Recreation Ground at St Bees was created in his memory.

Family
Lord Adams married Agnes Jane Birney in 1914. They had one son, Thomas Adams (b. 1923), who died in infancy. As Lord Adams had no surviving male issue the title became extinct upon his death on 23 August 1960.

Arms

References

 ‘ADAMS’, Who Was Who, A & C Black, 1920–2007; online edn, Oxford University Press, Dec 2007
 thePeerage.com
 "Whitehaven - An Illustrated History" by Daniel Hay. Published by Michael Moon 1979. .

1890 births
1960 deaths
People from Arlecdon and Frizington
Barons created by George VI